"Cedars of Lebanon" is a song by Irish rock band U2. It is the eleventh and final track on their 2009 album No Line on the Horizon. It is sung in the character of a war correspondent who is "squeezing complicated lives into a simple headline" and who "observes "this shitty world" where the aroma of a rose "lingers and then it just goes". The song samples producer Brian Eno's collaboration with Harold Budd, "Against the Sky", from the 1984 album The Pearl.

Reception
In a review of the album, Jon Pareles of The New York Times called the song "a somber meditation on war, separation and enmity". Comparing the song with "Moment of Surrender" on the same album, NME reviewer Ben Patashnik described "Cedars of Lebanon" as "similarly downbeat but no-less-enthralling", and said that the song "is buoyed by Larry Mullen Jr's martial drumming and a twinkling guitar". The Sydney Morning Herald called the song a "masterful closer", and said that the "backing vocals, ambient noises and restraint seal a deal alongside the atmosphere of philosophical weariness."

Personnel

U2
 Bono – lead vocals, guitar
 The Edge – guitar, backing vocals, piano
 Adam Clayton – bass guitar
 Larry Mullen Jr. – drums, percussion

Technical
Production – Daniel Lanois
Engineering – Tony Mangurian
Additional engineering – Declan Gaffney, Richard Rainey
Mixing – Lanois, Gaffney

References
Footnotes

Bibliography

External links
Lyrics at U2.com

2009 songs
Song recordings produced by Brian Eno
Song recordings produced by Daniel Lanois
Songs written by Adam Clayton
Songs written by Bono
Songs written by the Edge
Songs written by Larry Mullen Jr.
U2 songs